Bhatsa Dam, is an earthfill and gravity dam on Bhatsa river near Shahapur, Thane district in state of Maharashtra in India.

Specifications

Purpose
 Irrigation – Bhatsa dam has Right bank canal and Left bank canal for irrigation. However, only Right bank canal is functional which flows through Bhiwandi Taluka. 
 Water supply – Bhatsa dam is the major source of water for MCGM (Municipal Corporation of Greater Mumbai) and TMC (Thane Municipal Corporation). The water for both the municipal corporations is pumped from Pise Dam which is 50 km away from Bhatsa dam on Bhatsa river. Water for Khardi and 5 nearby villages is also pumped from the downstream side of the dam.
 Hydroelectric powerplant – It has a capacity of 15MW.

See also
 List of dams and reservoirs in Maharashtra
 List of dams and reservoirs in India

References

Dams in Thane district
Dams completed in 1983
1983 establishments in Maharashtra
20th-century architecture in India